Bursa scrobilator is a species of sea snail, a marine gastropod mollusk in the family Bursidae, the frog shells.

A study, published in 2019, has shown that the Atlantic-Mediterranean Bursa scrobilator forms a species complex with two extant forms, proposed as subspecies, and one fossil form:
 Bursa scrobilator scrobilator (Linnaeus, 1758) (synonym: Murex scrobilator Linnaeus, 1758) (distribution in the Atlantic Ocean and the Mediterranean Sea)
 Bursa scrobilator coriacea (Reeve, 1844) (synonym: Ranella coriacea Reeve, 1844) (distribution off West Africa)
 Bursa nodosa (fossil from Miocene strata in the Mediterranean Sea).

References

Bursidae
Gastropods described in 1758
Taxa named by Carl Linnaeus